Proteuxoa nuna is a moth of the family Noctuidae first described by Achille Guenée in 1868. It is found in the Australian Capital Territory, New South Wales, South Australia, Victoria and Western Australia.

External links
Australian Faunal Directory

Proteuxoa
Moths of Australia
Moths described in 1868